There have been three United States Navy ships with variations of the name Ingram:

 
 
 

United States Navy ship names